Abdelkhalek Louzani (13 July 1945 – 6 February 2021) was a Moroccan football player and coach.

Playing career
Louzani began his career in 1960 with hometown club ASS Essaouira, and played professionally with Belgian clubs Anderlecht, Crossing Elewijt and Olympic Charleroi.

Coaching career
Louzani began his coaching career in Belgium with Olympic Charleroi, before returning to Morocco in 1982.

He was manager of the Morocco national team in 1992 to 1993, and also managed a number of Moroccan club sides including Moghreb Tétouan, Olympique Khouribga, FUS Rabat, Ittihad Tanger, Kawkab Marrakech, Chabab d'Al Massira, COD Meknès, KAC Kénitra and Olympic Club de Safi.

Death
Louzani died from COVID-19 in Essaouira on 6 February 2021, at age 75, during the COVID-19 pandemic in Morocco.

References

1945 births
2021 deaths
People from Essaouira
Moroccan footballers
Association football midfielders
R.S.C. Anderlecht players
K.V.V. Crossing Elewijt players
R. Olympic Charleroi Châtelet Farciennes players
Moroccan football managers
Morocco national football team managers
Moghreb Tétouan managers
Kawkab Marrakech managers
Olympique Club de Khouribga managers
Fath Union Sport managers
Ittihad Tanger managers
COD Meknès managers
KAC Kénitra managers
Olympic Club de Safi managers
Deaths from the COVID-19 pandemic in Morocco
Moroccan expatriate footballers
Moroccan expatriate sportspeople in Belgium
Expatriate footballers in Belgium